The common emo skink or Erronan treeskink (Emoia erronan) is a species of lizard in the family Scincidae. It is found Futuna Island in Vanuatu.

References

Emoia
Reptiles described in 1991
Taxa named by Walter Creighton Brown